Susan Johnston OBE (née Wright; born 7 December 1943) is an English actress. She is known for portraying Sheila Grant in the Channel 4 soap opera Brookside (1982–1990), Barbara Royle in the BBC comedy The Royle Family (1998–2012), Grace Foley in the BBC drama Waking the Dead (2000–2011), Gloria Price in the ITV soap opera Coronation Street (2012–2014) and Miss Denker in the ITV drama Downton Abbey (2014–2015). She won the 2000 British Comedy Award for Best TV Comedy Actress and was nominated for the 2000 BAFTA TV Award for Best Comedy Performance for The Royle Family.

Early life
Johnston was born on 7 December 1943 in Warrington, Lancashire, and grew up in Prescot, also in Lancashire. She is the daughter of Fred and Margaret Jane Wright (née Cowan).

After working as a Higher Grade tax inspector, when her boyfriend was one of the pop group The Swinging Blue Jeans, she worked for Brian Epstein. From the age of 21, Johnston attended the Webber Douglas Academy of Dramatic Art in London.

Acting career

Johnston made her television debut, aged 38, with a minor recurring role on Coronation Street in the summer of 1982, playing the role of Mrs. Chadwick, the wife of a bookmaker.

From 1982 to 1990, she appeared as Sheila Grant in the soap opera Brookside. She appeared in the show's debut episode on 2 November 1982 – broadcast on the first day Channel 4 went on air – and her last episode was aired in September 1990, when the character was written out of the series following her divorce from Bobby Grant (Ricky Tomlinson) and remarriage to Billy Corkhill (John McArdle).

Since then she has appeared in many drama series and films, including Inspector Morse, Hetty Wainthropp Investigates, Brassed Off and My Uncle Silas. In 1992, Johnston appeared in the three-part award-winning drama Goodbye Cruel World, in which she portrayed a woman coming to terms with a muscle-wasting illness.

She was the subject of This Is Your Life in 1998, when she was surprised by Michael Aspel at the Royal Exchange Theatre, Manchester.

Johnston may be best known as Barbara Royle in the BBC comedy series The Royle Family, appearing from 1998 until 2012, with her former on-screen husband in Brookside, Ricky Tomlinson. 

From 2000 to 2011, she starred in the television series Waking the Dead, in which she played the role of psychological profiler Grace Foley, alongside Trevor Eve.

In 2004, she appeared in one episode of the series, Who Do You Think You Are?, in which she traced her family tree.

She starred in Jennifer Saunders's comedy drama Jam & Jerusalem on BBC One, alongside Joanna Lumley, Maggie Steed and David Mitchell. The first series aired in 2006, the second series began on New Year's Day 2008 and the third in August 2009. Also in 2008, she played Affery Flintwinch in the BBC adaptation of Little Dorrit. In May 2008 it was confirmed Johnston would return as Barbara Royle for another episode of The Royle Family, which aired on Christmas Day 2008 on BBC One. The show returned for further Christmas specials in 2009, 2010 and 2012. She shared a role with Billie Piper in the television adaptation of A Passionate Woman which aired on BBC One on 11 April 2010.

On 2 April 2012, Coronation Street series producer Phil Collinson announced Johnston had joined the soap opera as Gloria, the mother of Stella Price (played by Michelle Collins). She made her first screen appearance on 5 September 2012. It was announced in June 2013 that Johnston would leave the soap opera in 2014 to pursue other acting roles. She departed on 21 February 2014.

In December 2011, she played Eileen Lewis in the BBC one-off drama Lapland, a role which she reprised in 2013 for a series, Being Eileen.

In May 2014 it was announced that Johnston would guest star in the fifth series of the period drama Downton Abbey. She played Denker, a lady's maid to the Dowager Countess, played by Dame Maggie Smith.

In 2018 Johnston played Ivy-Rae in the BBC drama series, Age Before Beauty and in August 2019, she played Joan in the second series of Hold the Sunset.

Personal life
Johnston is a supporter of the Labour Party and has been an outspoken gay rights campaigner. She is a supporter of Liverpool F.C. and St Helens R.F.C.

In 1967, she married her first husband Neil Johnston and became pregnant at the age of 24. She suffered a miscarriage shortly after and the couple later divorced but she kept his surname as her professional name. She has one son, Joel, from her second marriage to David Pammenter. She has two grandchildren.

Johnston is staunchly opposed to smoking. Despite playing the role of heavy smoker Barbara Royle in The Royle Family, Johnston quit smoking in 1978, but had to smoke low-tar cigarettes while playing the role.

Johnston was appointed Officer of the Order of the British Empire (OBE) in the 2009 Birthday Honours. In November 2010, she was awarded an honorary doctorate by University of Chester at Chester Cathedral.

In 1989 Johnston, assisted by Lesley Thomson, published her first book, a memoir titled Hold on to the Messy Times. In 2011, she published another memoir titled Things I Couldn't Tell My Mother.

In 1970, Johnston was sexually attacked at the age of 27 which inspired her storyline in Brookside as Sheila Grant, where she was raped.

In her autobiography, Things I Couldn't Tell My Mother, she states that she was originally going to be called Margaret Jane Wright, after her mother and grandmother, but her father thought that it would be best to call her Susan.

Filmography

Film

Television
{| class="wikitable plainrowheaders sortable"
|-
! Title
! Year
! Role
! Notes
|-
| 1982
| Coronation Street
| Mrs. Chadwick
| 3 episodes
|-
| 1982–1990
| Brookside
| Sheila Grant
| Series regular
|-
| 1992
| Goodbye Cruel World
| Barbara Grade
| Miniseries – 3 episodes
|-
| 1992–1995
| Medics
| Ruth Parry
| 29 episodes
|-
|1992
| In Suspicious Circumstances
| Edith Rosse
| Episode 2.2 – "Maundy Money"
|-
|1992
| Inspector Morse
| Mrs. Bailey
| Episode 6.4 – "Absolute Conviction|-
|1992
| Screenplay| Miriam Johnson
| Episode 7.4 – "Bitter Harvest"
|-
|1992
| A Touch of Frost| Phyllis Bowman
| Episode 1.3 – "Conclusions"
|-
|1993
| Full Stretch| Grace Robbins
| 6 episodes
|-
|1993
| Luv| Terese Craven
| 18 episodes
|-
|1994
| Performance| Mistress Overdone
| Episode 4.2 – "Measure for Measure"
|-
|1996
| Into the Fire| Lyn
| Miniseries – 3 episodes
|-
|1996
| Hetty Wainthropp Investigates| Helga Allowby
| Episode 2.2 – "Poison Pen"
|-
|1997
| Crime Traveller| Kate Grisham
| 8 episodes
|-
|1998
| The Things You Do for Love: Against the Odds| Pat Phoenix
| TV film
|-    
|1998
|  Verdict| Hazel De Vere Q.C.
| Episode 1.3 – "The Doctor's Opinion"
|-
|1998
| Duck Patrol| Val Rutland
| 6 episodes
|-
|1998
| The Jump| Maeve Brunos
| 4 episodes
|-
|1998–2000  2006–2012
| The Royle Family| Barbara Royle
| All 25 episodes
|-
|1999
| Sex, Chips & Rock n' Roll| Irma Brookes
| All 6 episodes
|-
|2000–2011
|Waking the Dead| Dr. Grace Foley
| 9 seasons – 92 episodes
|-
|2001–2003
| My Uncle Silas| Mrs. Betts
| 9 episodes
|-
| 2001
|Score| Maggie
| TV film
|-
|2002
| Happy Together| Val
| TV film   
|-
|2004
| Cutting It| Caroline Ferraday
| Episode 3.4
|-
|2006
| The Street| Brenda McDermott
| Episode 1.2 – "Stan"
|-
|2008
| Little Dorrit| Affery Flintwinch
| Miniseries – 7 episodes
|-
|2006–2009
| Jam & Jerusalem| Sal Vine
| 3 seasons – 16 episodes
|-
|2009
| The Turn of the Screw| Sarah Grose
| TV film
|-
|2010
| A Passionate Woman| Betty
| 2 episodes
|-
|2011
| Sugartown| Margery
| 3 episodes
|-
| 2011
| Lapland| Eileen Lewis
| TV film  
|- 
|2012
| Gates| Miss Hunter
| 5 episodes
|-
|2012–2014
| Coronation Street| Gloria Price
| Regular role; 169 episodes
|-
|2013
| Being Eileen| Eileen Lewis
| 7 episodes
|-
|2014–2015
| Downton Abbey| Miss Denker
| 8 episodes
|-
|2016
| Rovers| Doreen
| All 6 episodes
|-
|2018
| Kiri| Celia Grayson
| Guest role – 1 episode
|-
|2018
|Moving On| Kathy
| Episode: "Lost"
|-
|2018
| The Good Karma Hospital| Virginia Mileham
| Series 2
|-
|2018
| Age Before Beauty| Ivy-Rae
| All 6 episodes
|-
|2018
| Death on the Tyne| Colleen
| TV film
|-
|2018–2019
| Hold the Sunset| Joan
| 5 episodes
|-
|2019–2021
| The Cockfields| Sue
| All 9 episodes
|-
|2019
| The Cure| Bella Bailey
| TV film
|-
|2020
| Unprecedented| Violet
| Episode: 1.5
|-
|2021
| Time| June Cobden
| All 3 episodes 
|-
|2021
|Help| Gloria
| TV film
|}

Additional credits
 Brookside: The Lost Weekend ... Sheila Corkhill (1997 video special)
 Brookside: Friday the 13th ... Sheila Corkhill (1998 video special)
 The Unseen Royals ... Narrator (1999 TV documentary)
 Caring for the Recently Deceased ... Marjoram Bryon (2014 short)
 2013 BBC Sports Personality of the Year'' ... Herself

References

External links

Sue Johnston at the British Film Institute
Sue Johnston (Aveleyman)

Living people
English film actresses
English television actresses
English soap opera actresses
Officers of the Order of the British Empire
Actresses from Warrington
Alumni of the Webber Douglas Academy of Dramatic Art
People from Muswell Hill
Labour Party (UK) people
British LGBT rights activists
20th-century English actresses
21st-century English actresses
1943 births
English autobiographers
English memoirists
People associated with the University of Chester